The Peruvian vesper mouse (Calomys sorellus) is a species of rodent in the family Cricetidae. It is found only in Peru.

References

 Baillie, J. 1996.  Calomys sorellus.   2006 IUCN Red List of Threatened Species.   Downloaded on 19 July 2007.
Musser, G. G. and M. D. Carleton. 2005. Superfamily Muroidea. pp. 894–1531 in Mammal Species of the World a Taxonomic and Geographic Reference. D. E. Wilson and D. M. Reeder eds. Johns Hopkins University Press, Baltimore.

Calomys
Mammals of Peru
Mammals described in 1900
Taxa named by Oldfield Thomas
Taxonomy articles created by Polbot